Combe, Devon may refer to various places in Devon, England:

 Combe, Buckfastleigh, Devon 
 Combe, Yealmpton, Devon
 Combe Fishacre 
 Combe Martin
 Combe Pafford
 Combe Raleigh

See also
 Coombe, Devon (disambiguation)